Trelawny was an electoral division of Cornwall in the United Kingdom which returned one member to sit on Cornwall Council between 2013 and 2021. It was abolished at the 2021 local elections, being split into four new divisions: Lostwithiel and Lanreath; Looe West, Pelynt, Lansallos and Lanteglos; Liskeard South and Dobwalls; and Looe East and Deviock.

Councillors

Extent
Trelawny represented the villages of Lanreath, Pelynt, Duloe, Sandplace, Widegates, Hessenford, Seaton and Downderry, and the hamlets of Muchlarnick, Trelawne, Churchbridge, Tredinnick, Tregarland, Morval, Torwell, Wringworthy, Trelowia, Deviock and Narkurs. The village of Herodsfoot was shared with the Menheniot division and the hamlet of No Man's Land was shared with the Looe East division. The division covers 9,745 hectares in total.

Election results

2017 election

2013 election

References

Electoral divisions of Cornwall Council